Beth Simone Noveck (born 1971) is New Jersey's first chief innovation officer, at Northeastern University where she directs the Burnes Center for Social Change, the Governance Lab and its MacArthur Research Network on Opening Governance. She is also affiliated faculty with the Institute for Experiential AI. She is the author of Solving Public Problems: How to Fix our Government and Change Our World (Yale Press 2021), Smart Citizens, Smarter State: The Technologies of Expertise and the Future of Government (Harvard 2015), Wiki Government: How Technology Can Make Government Better, Democracy Stronger, and Citizens More Powerful (Brookings 2009), and co-editor of the State of Play: Law and Virtual Worlds (NYU 2006). 

She is also a Visiting Senior Faculty Fellow at the John J. Heldrich Center for Workforce Development at Rutgers University, a Fellow at NYU's Institute for Public Knowledge, and a senior fellow at the Yale Law School Information Society Project. She also served as one of nine members of the Digitalrat, a council to advise German Federal Chancellor Angela Merkel on issues concerning the digital transformation of society.

From 2009 to 2011, she was the United States deputy chief technology officer for open government and led President Obama's Open Government Initiative. She was based at the White House Office of Science and Technology Policy, and served as an expert on governance, technology and institutional innovation. On May 16, 2011, she was appointed senior advisor for Open Government by UK Prime Minister David Cameron. She is a commissioner for the Global Commission on Internet Governance. On August 13, 2018, Noveck was appointed by Governor Phil Murphy to be the Chief Innovation Officer of New Jersey.

Background
Raised in Toms River, New Jersey, she graduated from Harvard University with an AM magna cum laude, and the University of Innsbruck with a Ph.D. She graduated from Yale Law School with a JD.

She directs The Governance Lab, also known as the Govlab and its MacArthur Research Network on Opening Governance, which is designed to improve people's lives through innovative governance. She also directs The Burnes Family Center for Global Impact at Northeastern University.

She was formerly the Jacob K. Javits Visiting Professor at the Robert F. Wagner Graduate School of Public Service and a visiting professor at the MIT Media Lab. She is a former professor of law at New York Law School and a senior fellow at the Yale Law School Information Society Project. She served in the White House as the first United States Deputy Chief Technology Officer and director of the White House Open Government Initiative from 2009 to 2011 under President Barack Obama. UK Prime Minister David Cameron appointed her senior advisor for Open Government, and she served on the Obama-Biden White House transition team. She has also designed or collaborated on Unchat, The Do Tank, Peer To Patent, Data.gov, Challenge.gov and the Gov Lab's Living Labs and training platform, The Academy. She works with the Chiba Institute of Technology Center for Radical Transformation in Japan as a Visiting Researcher. She helps edit the Association for Computing Machinery’s Digital Government Research and Practice Journal and is a founding associate editor for the Journal of Collective Intelligence.

She is a member of the Scholars Council of the Library of Congress and a board member of the Center for Open Science (COS), the Open Contracting Partnership, the EPSRC Center for the Mathematics of Precision Healthcare, the Yankelovich Democracy Monitor, and the NHS Digital Academy. In addition, Noveck is also a member of the President’s Commission on Transparency and Corruption and the Global Future Council on Technology, Values and Policy for the World Economic Forum through the Inter-American Development Bank, the Steering Committee for the Collective Intelligence Conferences and GIGAPP. 

She was named one of the Top 100 Global Thinkers by Foreign Policy, one of the "100 Most Creative People in Business" by Fast Company, and one of the "Top Women in Technology" by Huffington Post. She has also been honored by both the National Democratic Institute and Public Knowledge for her work in civic technology.

She is the author of Wiki Government: How Technology Can Make Government Better, Democracy Stronger and Citizens More Powerful,which has also appeared in Arabic, Russian, Chinese and in an audio edition, and co-editor of The State of Play: Law, Games and Virtual Worlds.Smart Citizens, Smarter State: The Technologies of Expertise and the Future of Governing appeared with Harvard University Press in 2015. Her latest book, Solving Public Problems: How to Fix Our Government and Change Our World appeared with Yale Press in 2021. 

Previously, Noveck directed the Institute for Information Law & Policy and the Democracy Design Workshop at New York Law School. She is the founder of the "Do Tank," and the State of Play Conferences, and launched Peer-to-Patent, the first community patent review project, in collaboration with the United States Patent and Trade Office. She has taught in the areas of intellectual property, innovation, and constitutional law, as well as courses on electronic democracy and electronic government.

References

External links 

 
 "Public Entrepreneurship: How to train 21st century leaders" by Beth Noveck for Apolitical.
 An interview in The Washington Post with Beth Simone Noveck: "The Obama administration wanted to open up government to citizen input. Why hasn't it worked?"
 cairns.typepad.com blog
 
 The Governance Lab
 
 Smarter Citizens Smarter State book
 Smarter Citizens website
 Regular column by Noveck on Governing
 Open Government Blog
 Noveck's comments from the Gov 2.0 Summit on Blip.tv
 Wiki Government book
 Presentation at the Long Now Foundation, "Transparent Government and the Long Now of Democracy"
 Office of the Governor | Governor Murphy Names Beth Simone Noveck as New Jersey's First Chief Innovation Officer

1971 births
Living people
People from Toms River, New Jersey
Obama administration personnel
American women engineers
Yale Information Society Project Fellows
Open government in the United States
Harvard University alumni
Yale Law School alumni
Polytechnic Institute of New York University faculty
University of Innsbruck alumni
American women legal scholars
American legal scholars
21st-century American women